The 1996 Clemson Tigers football team represented Clemson University during the 1996 NCAA Division I-A football season.

Schedule

Roster

References

Clemson
Clemson Tigers football seasons
Clemson Tigers football